De occulta philosophia is the debut album by Ukrainian black metal band Blood of Kingu. Originally released under Supernal Music, the band has since signed to Debemur Morti Productions and re-released the album with new artwork and packaging on August 28, 2009. Musically, the album contains fast tempos, and the vocals mainly consists of tibetan chants.

Track listing
 "Indoarika Incognita" – 1:10
 "Your Blood, Nubia! Your Power, Egypt!" – 4:28
 "Mummu Tiamat" – 4:00
 "Stronghold of Megaliths, Thorns and Human Bones" – 4:35
 "Slaughter of Shudras" – 0:44
 "Lair of Night Abzu" – 5:27
 "Black Spectral Wings of Shaman" – 4:45
 "Vajtarani" – 0:14
 "Chambers of Inpu-Su" – 3:03

Personnel
Roman Saenko – Vocals & All Instruments

Session member
 Yuriy Sinitsky - Drums

References

2007 debut albums
Blood of Kingu albums